Pseudoterpna rectistrigaria is a moth of the family Geometridae first described by Wiltshire in 1948. It is found on Cyprus.

The wingspan is about 30 mm.

References

Moths described in 1948
Pseudoterpnini